Call It a Day is a 1937 American comedy film directed by Archie Mayo and starring Olivia de Havilland, Ian Hunter, Anita Louise, Alice Brady, Roland Young, and Frieda Inescort. Based on the 1935 play Call It a Day by Dodie Smith, the film is about a day in the life of a middle-class London family whose lives are complicated by the first romantic signs of spring.

Cast

Production

Soundtrack
 "I'm Forever Blowing Bubbles" (James Kendis, James Brockman, Nat Vincent, John W. Kellette) performed by Ian Hunter
 "Isn't It Romantic?" (Richard Rodgers, Lorenz Hart) performed by Marcia Ralston

Reception
In his May 7, 1937, review, The New York Times' Frank Nugent said that he "enjoyed" the "tolerant and quietly humorous piece", and praised the ensemble cast. Two months later, writing for Night and Day, Graham Greene gave the film a poor review and complained about the self-sanitized story of temptations rejected in the face of infidelity. Greene also complains of the use of clichéd dialogue, which includes the stale line, "Do you mind if I slip into something more comfortable?" which, Greene adds, "to our astonishment [leads to] the temptress reappear[ing] in just another evening dress."

See also
 The First Day of Spring (1956)

References

External links
 
 Call It a Day on TCM
 
1946 Theatre Guild on the Air radio adaptation of original play at Internet Archive

1937 films
1937 comedy films
American comedy films
American black-and-white films
Films directed by Archie Mayo
Warner Bros. films
American films based on plays
Films set in London
Films based on works by Dodie Smith
1930s American films